Robson Luis Pereira da Silva (Volta Redonda, September 21, 1974), known as Luis Robson, is a former Brazilian footballer who played as a striker.

Robson began his professional career in Matsubara. He moved to Goiás in 1996. After spending a year at the club, he joined Corinthians on loan. Robson also had a period of one year with Leiria before moving to Russia, where he spent five years with Spartak Moscow, the most successful period in his career. During his time at Spartak he won five Russian Top League / Division titles and played in the Champions League. After leaving Spartak, Robson never rediscovered his best form and had short and unsuccessful spells in Japan and France, before returning to Brazil, where he played for Marilia. In 2006, his contract with Marilia expired and he ended his career.

Honours

Club 
Spartak Moscow
Russian Top Division / League: 1997, 1998, 1999, 2000, 2001 
Russian Cup: 1998

Individual 
CIS Cup top goalscorer: 2000 (shared)

References

External links
Sport Express Russia Player of the Year 
Bio at Peoples.ru 

1974 births
Living people
People from Volta Redonda
Brazilian footballers
Brazilian expatriate footballers
Expatriate footballers in Portugal
U.D. Leiria players
Expatriate footballers in Russia
FC Spartak Moscow players
Russian Premier League players
Hokkaido Consadole Sapporo players
FC Lorient players
Marília Atlético Clube players
Expatriate footballers in Japan
Expatriate footballers in France
J1 League players
Association football forwards
Sportspeople from Rio de Janeiro (state)